For Your Love is an American sitcom television series that premiered on March 17, 1998, on NBC. The series was created by Living Single creator, Yvette Lee Bowser. It starred Holly Robinson Peete, James Lesure, Tamala Jones, Edafe Blackmon, Dedee Pfeiffer, and D. W. Moffett. It was canceled by NBC after eight episodes but was picked up by The WB. It ran for a total of five seasons, with its last episode airing on August 11, 2002.

Synopsis
For Your Love focused on three couples who try to counsel each other on how to deal with the opposite sex. At the start of the series, Sheri & Dean were the relationship "veterans," having been together for 15 years, married for the last four. Malena (Sheri's best friend) & Mel were newlyweds, moving next door to Sheri & Dean in the pilot. Bobbi & Reggie (Mel's younger brother) were dating, two "commitment-phobes" who were more devoted to each other than either would readily admit.

The theme song (a cover version of the song of the same name originally performed by the Yardbirds) was performed by Chaka Khan and Michael McDonald.

Cast

Main
Holly Robinson Peete as Malena Ellis
James Lesure as Melvin "Mel" Ellis
Tamala Jones as Barbara Jean 'Bobbi' Seawright Ellis
Edafe Blackmon as Reginald "Reggie" Ellis
Dedee Pfeiffer as Sheri DeCarlo-Winston
D. W. Moffett as Dean Winston

Recurring
Natalie Desselle as Eunetta
Stuart Pankin as Mr. Gerard (1999–2001)
Constance Marie as Samantha
MC Lyte as Lana
David Ramsey as Brian
Kelly Perine as Paul
Jessica Kiper as Amber (1999–2002)
Eugene Byrd as Omar Ellis (2002)

Episodes

Series Overview

Season 1 (1998)

Season 2 (1998–99)

Season 3 (1999–2000)

Season 4 (2000–01)

Season 5 (2002)

Broadcast
In July 2006, TV One began airing the series in syndicated reruns. In March 2023, TV One returned airing the series in syndicated reruns.

Awards and nominations

References

External links
 

1990s American black sitcoms
2000s American black sitcoms
1990s American sitcoms
2000s American sitcoms
1998 American television series debuts
2002 American television series endings
NBC original programming
The WB original programming
Television series about couples
Television series by Warner Bros. Television Studios
English-language television shows
American television series revived after cancellation
1990s American romantic comedy television series
2000s American romantic comedy television series